Meskin (also Romanized as Meskīn) is a village in Nazlu-e Shomali Rural District, Nazlu District, Urmia County, West Azerbaijan Province, Iran. At the 2006 census, its population was 296, in 38 families.

References 

Populated places in Urmia County